Cindy Williams may refer to:

Cindy Williams (1947–2023), American actress
Cindy Williams (journalist) (born 1963), American journalist
Cindy Williams (EastEnders), fictional character from British soap opera EastEnders
Cyndi Williams, American voice actor
Cindy Beale, also Williams, another EastEnders character

See also
Cynda Williams (born 1966), American television and film actress